The Samsung SPH-A460 was a popular Clamshell CDMA cellphone in the early 2000s and was released to Sprint in 2002 and had two Monochrome Screens one on the front and one on the inside.

External links
 Samsung SPH-A460 Specs & Features (Phone Scoop)

A460
Mobile phones introduced in 2002